The Sri Lankan cricket team toured New Zealand for cricket matches during the 2005–06 season. Sri Lanka were scheduled to play five one-day international games and three Test matches in the 2004–05 season, beginning their tour on 26 December 2004, but due to the 2004 Indian Ocean earthquake which hit the island of Sri Lanka hard, the Sri Lankan team travelled home after the first of the One Day Internationals. The Test matches were rescheduled to April, and the remaining four ODIs were played between 31 December 2005 and 8 January 2006.

2004–05 tour

1st ODI

New Zealand won the first match of the series by seven wickets and with 17 overs to spare. After this match however, due to the difference between New Zealand and Sri Lankan time zone the tsunami hit South East Asian countries, including Sri Lanka; spin bowler Muttiah Muralitharan missed being hit by the tsunami by twenty minutes . Concerns for relatives led the Sri Lankan team to head home  . The Test match series was postponed until April.

In place of the Sri Lankan fixtures in the 2004–05 season New Zealand played a composite team, the FICA World XI led by Shane Warne. 

The Sri Lankan and New Zealand Cricket boards rescheduled the one day matches for the 2005–06 season.

2005–06 tour

Sri Lanka were coming off a 1–6 series defeat on tour of India in November, while New Zealand lost 0–4 in their most recent ODI series, in South Africa in October. Both teams were in mid-table of the ICC ODI Championship when the series began, with Sri Lanka in sixth and New Zealand in fourth place – though both teams had a 109 points. A loss for either of the teams would place them outside the top six of the ODI Championship, and places in the top six on 1 April 2006 would guarantee an appearance at the 2006 Champions Trophy . New Zealand won the first three of the four matches, but ended up losing the fourth in chase of a winning target of 274, which meant Sri Lanka avoided the whitewash. They did, however, fall into seventh place before playing in the VB Series in Australia later that month.

Peter Fulton, who had only played one One Day International before this series, topped the run-scoring tables for the four-match series, scoring 264 runs with one century and two fifties. For Sri Lanka, captain Marvan Atapattu top-scored with 175, including a 69 in the final match which gave him the Man of the Match award. On the bowling side, Chaminda Vaas began with a total of two wickets in the first two matches, before taking five for 39 and four for 48 to end with 11 wickets at a bowling average of 15.27, the second-lowest in the series (excluding Nathan Astle, who bowled three overs). No other Sri Lankan bowler took more than three wickets. For New Zealand, Shane Bond took nine wickets, Kyle Mills five and Jacob Oram four, all at an average below 21. Jeetan Patel only played one match, the third, where he was named Man of the Match after a spell of 10–0–23–2, which gave him the lowest bowling average of the series.

Squads 

Andre Adams was originally selected, but broke a bone in his right hand before the series started and was replaced by Franklin.

Fleming withdrew from the first One Day International to be with his wife during the birth of his first child. Vettori captained the side in the first match, while Astle was selected as a replacement after being dropped originally.

Mills and Oram withdrew before the third ODI due to injury. Martin and Franklin replaced them, while Astle was dropped for a returning Fleming. Astle did play the fourth ODI, however.

2nd ODI

Sri Lanka were put in to bat by New Zealand captain Daniel Vettori, and after going through the first eight overs without losing a wicket, Sanath Jayasuriya and Kumar Sangakkara were caught in successive overs. Mahela Jayawardene lasted 10 balls before he, too, was caught, and the three New Zealand seamers Shane Bond, Kyle Mills and Jacob Oram had a wicket each. Oram got another in the 15th over, when opener Upul Tharanga was caught behind for 17, before captain and number five Marvan Atapattu rebuilt with Tillakaratne Dilshan. Their partnership lasted nearly 14 overs, as both passed 20, but Atapattu was caught for 35, and seven overs later Dilshan was also caught, for 42. The last four wickets yielded 31 runs, and Sri Lanka were all out for 164 when Muttiah Muralitharan was caught at mid-off for 0 .

Chasing, New Zealand lost Lou Vincent and Nathan Astle for sub-20 scores (Astle facing 15 balls but only scoring two runs), before their third-wicket pairing, who had played a combined total of one ODI before this match, added 95 runs for the third wicket. Jamie How, the ODI debutant, was eventually bowled when he missed a slog sweep off Sanath Jayasuriya, and was out for 58, but Hamish Marshall chipped in with 16 not out in the unbeaten fourth-wicket stand, and New Zealand won by seven wickets with more than 12 overs remaining.

3rd ODI

4th ODI

5th ODI

References

  Sri Lanka in New Zealand, 2004-05, 1st One-Day International from Cricinfo, 26 December 2004
  Malinga and Fernando affected by tsunami from Cricinfo, 28 December 2004
  Sri Lankan players want to go home from Cricinfo, 28 December 2004
  Sri Lanka head home from New Zealand by Steven Lynch, from Cricinfo, 29 December 2005
  Pura Cup round delayed to help New Zealand from Cricinfo, 9 January 2005
  New Zealand and Sri Lanka eye ICC rankings published on Cricinfo 30 December 2005
  New Zealand Squad from Cricinfo, retrieved 31 December 2005
  Sri Lanka Squad from Cricinfo, retrieved 31 December 2005
  Adams withdraws from Sri Lanka series published on Cricinfo 28 December 2005
  Fleming to miss first ODI published on Cricinfo 29 December 2005
  Astle and McMillan dumped for one-day series published on Cricinfo 23 December 2005
  Astle makes way for Fleming, published on Cricinfo on 4 January 2006
  New Zealand v Sri Lanka at Queenstown, 31 December 2005, scorecard from Cricinfo, retrieved 31 December 2005
  Fulton and How demolish Sri Lanka by S Rajesh of Cricinfo, published 31 December 2005
  New Zealand v Sri Lanka at Christchurch, 3 January 2005, scorecard from Cricinfo, retrieved 8 January 2005
  New Zealand v Sri Lanka at Wellington, 6 January 2005, scorecard from Cricinfo, retrieved 8 January 2005
  New Zealand v Sri Lanka at Napier, 8 January 2005, scorecard from Cricinfo, retrieved 8 January 2005

2006 in New Zealand cricket
2006 in Sri Lankan cricket
2005–06 New Zealand cricket season
International cricket competitions in 2005–06
2005-06